Sir Crispin Hamlyn Agnew of Lochnaw, 11th Baronet,  (born 13 May 1944) is a Scottish advocate, herald and former explorer. He is the chief of the ancient Agnew family, and the eleventh holder of the Agnew baronetcy, created in 1629.

Agnew is the only son of Sir Fulque Agnew and his wife Swanzie Erskine, latterly Professor of Geography at the University of Malawi. He succeeded his father in 1975.

He was educated at Uppingham School and RMA Sandhurst, before being commissioned into the Royal Highland Fusiliers in 1964. He served in Germany, Cyprus, Northern Ireland and the UK. As an active climber and mountaineer and member of the Alpine Club (UK) he was involved with the army's policy of developing adventurous training for soldiers of all ranks. He took part in or led a number of expeditions, including expeditions to Api Himal in 1980, Everest in 1976, Nuptse Himal in 1975, Northern Patagonian Ice Field in 1973, Elephant Island in 1970, and Greenland in 1968 and 1966. He retired as a major in 1981.

Agnew is a King's Counsel and was in practice at the Scottish Bar with Westwater Advocates before going non-practising in April 2020. He was ranked by Chambers & Partners UK 2018 as a "Star Individual" in Agriculture and Rural Affairs and "Band 1" in Planning and Environment. He specialised in rural property, planning & environmental, and public law. He was made an Honorary Research Fellow at the University of Dundee in 2020. He is the author of legal textbooks on agriculture, crofting, land obligations and liquor licensing as well as articles in academic journals. He served as a part-time judge of the Upper Tribunal (formerly Social Security Commissioner) (2000 to 2018) and was part-time legal chairman of the Pension Appeal Tribunal (2002 to 2012). He is a legal convenor of the Mental Health Tribunal for Scotland (2018-).

His heraldic career began in 1978 when he was appointed Slains Pursuivant by Merlin, Earl of Erroll. In 1981, he was appointed Unicorn Pursuivant  at the Court of the Lord Lyon in Edinburgh. In 1986, he was promoted to Rothesay Herald, a position he held until 31 August 2021, when he became Albany Herald Extraordinary.

He was appointed Lieutenant of the Royal Victorian Order (LVO) in the 2021 Birthday Honours.

In 1980 he married Susan Rachel Strang Steel, a careers adviser and formerly a journalist and broadcaster, the daughter of Jock Wykeham Strang Steel and Lesley Graham. Agnew and his wife have a son and three daughters: Mark, Isabel, Emma and Roseanna. Mark Agnew is the Younger of Lochnaw, and the heir to the chiefship and baronetcy.

Arms

References

External links
Debrett's biography

Crsipin
Baronets in the Baronetage of Nova Scotia
21st-century King's Counsel
Members of the Faculty of Advocates
Royal Highland Fusiliers officers
1944 births
Living people
Scottish officers of arms
Scottish King's Counsel
Scottish explorers
Graduates of the Royal Military Academy Sandhurst
Lieutenants of the Royal Victorian Order
Explorers from the United Kingdom